Fareham Shopping Centre is at the heart of the centre of the medium-sized Hampshire town of Fareham.  Built in two phases between 1975 and 1981, the centre contains many well known retailers and is quite large for a town of its size.  The shopping centre is part of a wider scheme of buildings in the town centre that were constructed around the same time.

Neighbouring buildings
Neighbouring buildings include:

 A large multi-storey car park
 A health centre
 A large library
 A concert hall
 A tower containing the civic offices

Shops
The shopping centre was originally anchored by a Sainsbury's supermarket, Woolworths, Boots and Marks & Spencer.  The 1981 Eastern extension added a new anchor store - BHS and another multistorey car park, as well as numerous other shops.  Sainsbury's moved out in the mid 1990s as the store was small by modern standards and Woolworths closed during the 2008/9 Christmas period because the retailer had gone into administration. During the mid 2000s, Portsmouth FC briefly rented a retail store at 46 Westbury Square within the shopping centre.  Recent retailers to move into Fareham Shopping centre include Next (opened September 2010) and HMV (opened November 2010 - Closed in February 2011, clearly on a short term contract for the festive season) and Debenhams which opened in Summer 2011.

Refurbishment
The shopping centre had a typical 1970s dark interior until the late 1990s when it was refurbished to become much more bright and airy.  The old interior featured a trail on the floor which if followed, led in a complete circle around all parts of the centre.

Atriums
It features four atriums which all have names:

 Thackeray Square - The Northern atrium.  The Boots store opens up off this square which also has Cafe Giardino in the middle.
 Delme Square - The Western atrium featuring Marks and Spencers and (formerly) Woolworths. This has a Costa Coffee in the centre
 Westbury Square - The South-Central square which connects to all the other malls in the centre.  The square also has a BB's cafe in the middle.
 Osborn Square - part of the 1981 extension, this square was dominated by BHS until its closure in 2016. Has since been replaced by B&M.

References

External links
 Fareham Shopping Centre on The Retail Database

Shopping centres in Hampshire
Fareham